The 2022–23 season of the Frauen-Bundesliga is the 33rd season of Germany's premier women's football league. It runs from 16 September 2022 to 29 May 2023.

The fixtures were announced on 5 July 2022.

Teams

Team changes

Stadiums

League table

Results

Top scorers

References

External links
DFB.de

2022-23
2022–23 in German women's football leagues
Current association football seasons